Starr Gideon Kempf (August 13, 1917 in Bluffton, Ohio – April 7, 1995 in Colorado Springs, Colorado) was an American sculptor, architect, and artist best known for his graceful steel wind kinetic sculptures.

Life 
Starr Kempf was raised on a small farm in Ohio, near the Swiss Mennonite community of Bluffton. His family, including his father and seven uncles, were blacksmiths and carpenters, from whom he learned craftsmanship and engineering at an early age.

He attended the Cleveland Institute of Art on a scholarship, where he received high marks for his paintings and drawings. After graduating, he served in the United States Air Force during World War II. He married recent German immigrant Hedwig Roelen in 1942, who was a nurse at Glockner Penrose Hospital in Colorado Springs. In 1948, they purchased the property of their future home in Cheyenne Canyon, where Starr designed and built a house and art studio. They had three children: Madelin, Michael, and Charlotte.

Starr began to work in bronze sculpture in 1955, which he sold to collectors around the United States. As of 1977, his vision had blossomed into the creation of elaborate steel wind sculptures, each of which took him up to three years to construct. His kinetic wind sculptures were designed to exhibit graceful movement and interaction with the wind; with a few powering spotlights to showcase his pieces and one that triggered music as it rotated.  His work often took the form of birds or weather vanes, and typically stood more than fifty feet in height.

Starr Kempf committed suicide by gunshot on April 7, 1995.

References

External links 
 Colorado Springs Independent article on Kempf zoning controversy, sculpture removal
 Wixx, David, Photographs of the collection of Starr Kempf sculptures

Architects from Colorado
American male sculptors
Modern sculptors
Sculptors from Colorado
Artists who committed suicide
Suicides by firearm in Colorado
1917 births
1995 deaths
20th-century American architects
20th-century American sculptors
Sculptors from Ohio
Architects from Ohio
1995 suicides
20th-century American male artists
People from Colorado Springs, Colorado